This is a list of films which have placed number one at the weekend box office in Romania during 2021.

List

Highest-grossing films

Spider-Man: No Way Home became the 14th film to pass the 10 million lei mark.

References 

2021
Romania
2021 in Romania